Ingando camps are Rwandan political and civic reeducation and indoctrination camps. These camps were created by the ruling party of Rwanda, the Rwandan Patriotic Front (RPF). Ingando camp participants are required to wear military uniforms, live together and participate in shared activities.

History 

Ingando camps were developed by RPF in an effort to increase mobilization following the Rwandan Civil War. In the aftermath of the Rwandan Civil War, RPF took control of the country and used the first Ingando camps for Tutsi returnees.

The program was ostensibly initiated to aid recovery following the genocide.  From 1996 to 1999, the Ingando program was administered by the Ministry of Youth, Culture and Sports. Thereafter, the National Unity and Reconciliation Commission took over. A significant proportion of Ingando camps are for ex-rebels.

Activities 

Ingando camps are administered by the Rwanda Demobolization and Reintegration Commission. Participants take part in classes on "civic education, unity and reconciliation, government programs, psychological demilitarization, reintegration into civilian life, and HIV/AIDS". Many participants return home after the program, while others are encouraged (or forced) to join the Rwandan military.

The NGO Asylos reported a case of a Hutu-Tutsi girl called to go to the Ingando camp and who "was subject to high levels of violence, discrimination, and repeated abuse, experiencing sexual harassment and multiple episodes of rape".

Notes

References 
 
 
Political organisations based in Rwanda

External links 
 Rwandapedia website